Percy Bushby (27 May 1919 – 29 August 1975) was an Australian rules footballer who played in the Victorian Football League (VFL).

He played in the Essendon premiership teams in 1942 and 1946. He won the Essendon best and fairest award in 1944.

Bushby captain-coached Stawell to a premiership in 1950 and led Ararat to four flags from 1955 to 1958.

External links

1919 births
Australian rules footballers from New South Wales
Essendon Football Club players
Essendon Football Club Premiership players
Stawell Football Club players
Ararat Football Club players
Coburg Football Club coaches
Crichton Medal winners
1975 deaths
Two-time VFL/AFL Premiership players